Mark Weedon (31 July 1968 – 7 August 2021) was a New Zealand rugby union player.

Biography
Born in Tauranga on 31 July 1968, Weedon started playing club rugby in Katikati in the Western Bay of Plenty. 

He attended Katikati College and made the 1986 New Zealand national schoolboy rugby union team. A lock, he represented  at a provincial level from 1986 to 1987, and later from 2001 to 2002, captaining the side during the latter period. Weedon was an All Blacks triallist in 1995. Between 1997 and 2002, he played professionally in England for Wasps, making 56 appearances.

Weedon was married and had two children. He died on 7 August 2021, aged 53.

References

1968 births
2021 deaths
Rugby union players from Tauranga
New Zealand rugby union players
Bay of Plenty rugby union players
North Harbour rugby union players
Chiefs (rugby union) players
Crusaders (rugby union) players
New Zealand expatriate sportspeople in England
Wasps RFC players
Rugby union locks